Cleber Resende de Oliveira or simply Cleber Goiano (born January 6, 1979 in Heitoraí), is a Brazilian defensive midfielder. He currently plays for Santa Cruz.

Honours
Goiás State League: 2001, 2003, 2006

External links
 sambafoot
 CBF
 zerozero.pt
 Guardian Stats Centre
 goiasesporteclube.com

1979 births
Living people
Brazilian footballers
Vila Nova Futebol Clube players
Goiás Esporte Clube players
Ipatinga Futebol Clube players
Paulista Futebol Clube players
Guarani FC players
Fortaleza Esporte Clube players
Santa Cruz Futebol Clube players
Association football midfielders